

2015 Bakersfield Rock & Country Music & Art Festival

The 2015 Bakersfield Rock & Country Music & Art Festival is located in Bakersfield, California. It was a one-day series of concerts with 34 national acts, and over 50 local acts all performing on a total of seven stages.

The festival is the brainchild of local attorney George Martin, who for years organized the "Bakersfield Business Conference", a hot-ticket conclave that has drawn to the city A-listers from the worlds of politics, entertainment, and sports. This festival has been compared to those such as Coachella, Stagecoach, Bakersfield Jazz Festival, and many more big name festivals. It was a way for Bakersfield residents to see famous musicians without having to worry about traveling and booking hotels.

Stages
The festival has three different categories of stages that concert-goers can go to in order to watch their favorite acts. The different stages include: Classic Rock, Country, and Legends. The Classic Rock stage is for attendees who want to take it back a few decades and want the music to "choose them." The country stage is for those who know and love country music, whether they are young or old. The Legends stage is for those who  want to travel back in time and relive the legends of country, rock and popular music.

Artists Performing
This festival has brought in over 34 national acts as well as over 50 talented homegrown local acts. The lineup includes some big names such as Kellie Pickler, LeeAnn Rimes, Gloriana, and many more. The bands and acts that attended the 2015 Festival were:
Teddy Spanke & The Tex Pistols
Kim McAbee
Mark Dooley
Andy Dooley
Truxton Mile
Johnny Owens
Amber Appleton
Theresa Spanke
Rockwell & The Blackboard Playboys
Less Besser
Rick Reno Stevens
Joe Reed
Donny Haron
Red Simpson
Gene Thome
Vint Varner
Jennifer Keel
Susan Ray
Whitney Wattenbarger
Foster & Friends
The Ray Sisters
Blonde Faith
John Hollins Band
Cowboy Calvin Band
Kern River Band
Tommy Hays Band
Lon Olson
Fruit Tramps
Bobby Durham Band
Banshee in the Kitchen
The Nightlife Band
The Bakersfield Band
Thee Majestics
Mayf Nutter
Zach Arnold
Jeff Davis
Danny Garone and The Iron Outlaws
Kevin Mahan
Tamera Mahan
Tim Mahan
Tim Stonelake
Gary Morgan
Dueling Pianos
Catfish Hunter Band
Becky DeShields
Peter, Paul and Mary Tribute
The Wayward Winds
Tina Michelle & the Rhinestone Cowboys
Brant Cotton Band
Grant Langston
Marc Madewell & the Fireball Express

Other Events
The Festival is not only an event for music lovers, but there are also many different events going on. For example, there is "Wonderland" which is a mini amusement park for kids and parents  to enjoy. There is also a car show, arts and crafts show, sports village, fireworks spectacular, many culinary delights for friends and family to enjoy, and many more exciting events available to check out.

References

External links
Bakersfield Rock and Country Music and Art Festival Facebook 

Rock festivals in the United States
Country music festivals in the United States
Music festivals in California
Music of Bakersfield, California